The name Peggy has been used for three tropical cyclones in the Western Pacific Ocean:

 Tropical Storm Peggy (1945)
 Typhoon Peggy (1986)
 Tropical Storm Peggy (1989)

It has also been used for one tropical cyclone in the South-West Indian Ocean:

 Cyclone Peggy (1965)

Pacific typhoon set index articles
South-West Indian Ocean cyclone set index articles